ANZ Bank Centre is a premium grade commercial office building in Sydney, New South Wales, Australia.

Description
The glass style building was designed by Francis-Jones Morehen Thorp (FJMT), a Sydney-based architectural firm and construction was carried out by Grocon, a Melbourne-based developer.

Located at 161 Castlereagh Street, a large pedestrian plaza links Castlereagh Street with Pitt Street. The tower mostly feature commercial use, with the ANZ Bank signing up for naming rights and a large amount of floor space. Retail space will be available at ground level with frontages to both Castlereagh and Pitt Streets.

The topping out ceremony, marking the completion of the building's structure, was held on 13 July 2012. Construction of the 800 million tower was completed in April 2013.

A private penthouse located on two levels, levels 43 and 44, with a rooftop pool and terrace is accessible by a one-stop private lift.

Legion House, a heritage listed building located at the site has been redeveloped into unique office accommodation as part of the project.

The lift system for ANZ Bank Centre was supplied by Schindler.

Major tenants
 ANZ Bank - 
 Herbert Smith Freehills -

See also
 List of tallest buildings in Sydney
 List of tallest buildings in Australia
 Architectural renders and drawings of 161 Castlereagh Street

References

External links
 

Buildings and structures in Sydney
Skyscrapers in Sydney
Office buildings in Sydney
Bank buildings in New South Wales
Office buildings completed in 2013
2013 establishments in Australia
Australia and New Zealand Banking Group
Neomodern architecture
Skyscraper office buildings in Australia
Retail buildings in New South Wales
Sydney central business district